Abdoulaye Diakité (born 13 January 1977) is a Malian footballer who played as a goalkeeper. He played in five matches for the Mali national football team from 2000 to 2010, and was also named in Mali's squad for the 2002 African Cup of Nations tournament. At the club level he served as team captain for Djoliba AC.

References

External links
 

1977 births
Living people
Malian footballers
Mali international footballers
2002 African Cup of Nations players
Place of birth missing (living people)
Association football goalkeepers
Djoliba AC players
Malian Première Division players
21st-century Malian people